Lothar Gall (born 3 December 1936 in Lötzen, East Prussia, present day Poland) is a German historian known as "one of German liberalism's primary historians". He was professor of history at Goethe University Frankfurt from 1975 until his retirement in 2005.

Gall's doctoral thesis examined the political thought of Benjamin Constant, and its influence in Vormärz Germany. His next book was a regional study of liberalism in Baden between 1848 and 1871. This informed an influential 1975 article about the effects of the 1848 revolution upon German liberalism: Gall argued that the revolution transformed liberalism from a constitutional movement committed to a classless society of burghers to an economically bourgeois ideology committed to free-market capitalism. His biography of Otto von Bismarck has been translated into English.

His father is Franz Gall, a General Lieutenant in the Wehrmacht, who was killed in Italy in December 1944.

Works
 Benjamin Constant; seine politische Ideenwelt und der deutsche Vormärz, 1963.
 Das Bismarck-Problem in der Geschichtsschreibung nach 1945, 1971.
 Bismarck, 1980. Translated by J. A. Underwood as Bismarck, the white revolutionary, 1986.
 Europa auf dem Weg in die Moderne, 1850-1890, 1984.
 Bürgertum in Deutschland, 1989.
 (ed.) Stadt und Bürgertum im 19. Jahrhundert, 1990.
 (ed.) Vom alten zum neuen Bürgertum : die mitteleuropäische Stadt im Umbruch 1780-1820, 1991.
 (ed.) Neuerscheinungen zur Geschichte des 20. Jahrhunderts, 1992.
 (ed.) Stadt und Bürgertum im Übergang von der traditionalen zur modernen Gesellschaft, 1993.
 (ed. with Dieter Langewiesche) Liberalismus und Region : zur Geschichte des deutschen Liberalismus im 19. Jahrhundert, 1995
 Die Deutsche Bank, 1870-1995, 1995.
 (ed.) Bürgertum und bürgerlich-liberale Bewegung in Mitteleuropa seit dem 18. Jahrhundert, 1997
 Milestones - Setbacks - Sidetracks: The Path to Parliamentary Democracy in Germany, Historical Exhibition in the Deutscher Dom in Berlin (2003), exhibit catalog; heavily illustrated, 420pp
 Wilhelm von Humboldt: Ein Preusse von Welt, Propyläen (2011), 436 pp.

References

1936 births
Living people
20th-century German historians
People from Giżycko
People from East Prussia
German male non-fiction writers
Knights Commander of the Order of Merit of the Federal Republic of Germany
21st-century German historians